Col du Marchairuz (elevation ) is a high mountain pass in the Jura Mountains in the canton of Vaud in Switzerland.

It connects Le Brassus and Bière. The pass road has a maximum grade of 14 percent.

See also

 List of highest paved roads in Europe
 List of mountain passes
 List of the highest Swiss passes

Marchairuz
Marchairuz
Mountain passes of the canton of Vaud